Ørland Ballklubb is a Norwegian sports club from Brekstad, Sør-Trøndelag. It has sections for association football and team handball.

The club was founded on 18 January 1994 as a cooperation team between Opphaug IL, Brekstad BK and IL Yrjar.

The men's football team currently plays in the Fifth Division, the sixth tier of Norwegian football. It had a stint in the 3. divisjon in the early 1990s, until 1994.

Players who started their career there include Jo Tessem, Kjell Rune Sellin and Sivert Solli.

References

Official site 

Football clubs in Norway
Association football clubs established in 1994
Sport in Trøndelag
1994 establishments in Norway